Muara means estuary in the  Malay and Indonesian languages and  may refer to:

Places

Muara, Brunei, a town in the Brunei-Muara District, Brunei
Brunei-Muara District, northernmost district in Brunei
Muara Bungo Airport, an airport in Muara Bungo, Jambi, Indonesia
Maura (district), a district in the North Tapanuli Regency of North Sumatra province, Sumatra, Indonesia
Muara Enim, capital of Muara Enim Regency, South Sumatra province, Sumatra, Indonesia
Muara Karang, an administrative village of Penjaringan, North Jakarta, Indonesia
Muara Kemumu, a subdistrict of Kepahiang Regency, Bengkulu, Indonesia
 Muara Satui, an anchorage coal loading port in South Kalimantan, Indonesia
Muara Takus, a Buddhist temple complex in Riau province, Sumatra, Indonesia
Muara Tebas, estuary at the mouth of the Sarawak River in Malaysia

Other uses
 "Muara Hati", 2012 song by Malaysian artists Siti Nurhaliza and Hafiz Suip

See also
Muar (disambiguation)